Sir John Butler (1511/14 – 1576), of Watton at Stone, Hertfordshire, was an English politician.

He was the eldest son of Sir Philip Butler.

He was appointed High Sheriff of Essex and Hertfordshire for 1532–33 and 1539–40 and elected a Member (MP) of the Parliament of England for Hertfordshire in October 1553.

References

 

1510s births
1576 deaths
People from Watton-at-Stone
Members of the Parliament of England for Hertfordshire
English MPs 1553 (Mary I)
High Sheriffs of Essex
High Sheriffs of Hertfordshire